The J. Kensley House is an historic house located at 342 Chestnut Street in Uxbridge, Massachusetts.  The  story brick house was built c. 1820, and is an excellent local example of Federal styling.  The house has a central chimney, and an asymmetrical facade, whose center entry retains its original door.  The house remained in the Kensley family (under a variety of spellings) until the late 19th century.

On October 7, 1983, it was added to the National Register of Historic Places as the J. Kensely House.

See also
National Register of Historic Places listings in Uxbridge, Massachusetts

References

External links
 J. Kensley House MACRIS Listing

Houses in Uxbridge, Massachusetts
National Register of Historic Places in Uxbridge, Massachusetts
Houses on the National Register of Historic Places in Worcester County, Massachusetts
Federal architecture in Massachusetts